Grafton Regis is a village and civil parish in the south of the English county of Northamptonshire. The population of the civil parish (including Alderton) at the 2001 census was 152. This increased to 253 at the 2011 census. The village is east of the A508 road, on which it has a short frontage and two bus stops.

This village is "linked" with the title of the Duke of Grafton (the first Duke was a son of King Charles II of England ).

History
The village's name means 'Grove farm/settlement'. The village was a crown possession hence the 'Regis' addition.

The prehistoric site dates back to circa 2500 BC according to Iron Age pottery which was found to the west of the main Northampton Road and to the south of Grafton Lodge which was a Roman site which produced pottery.

A substantial capital messuage stood west of the Church in the Middle Ages. From 1100 to 1348, the manor was in the hands of a Norman monastery whose bailiff or lessee probably occupied the house.

In 1440, the mansion officially became a 'manor house' which belonged to the Woodville family  during which time the village was known as Grafton Woodville. The manor was the birthplace of Elizabeth Woodville, queen consort to King Edward IV. Also born at the manor was Elizabeth's younger brother, Anthony Woodville, 2nd Earl Rivers KG (ca.1440 –1483), a courtier, bibliophile and writer.

The house and manor passed to the Grey Marquesses of Dorset who were descendants of queen consort Elizabeth Woodville by her first marriage to Sir John Grey. At the end of the 15th century, the house and manor passed to King Henry VIII, grandson of Elizabeth Woodville by Edward IV.

Anne of Denmark and King James stayed at Grafton Regis in June 1603 and travelled on to Salden Manor at Mursley. They were hosted at Grafton by George Clifford, 3rd Earl of Cumberland, Keeper of Grafton Regis since 1602, who organised a tournament involving the Alexander or Zinzan brothers. Lady Anne Clifford later wrote that her father lived in the "old house at Grafton" and entertained the king and queen with "great magnificence". The manor was granted to Prince Henry, and he rewarded musicians at Grafton with £1 on 19 August 1610.

Geography
The ancient parish of Grafton Regis occupied some 1,300 acres on the west bank of the river Tove. The village extends back some distance from the road, albeit at a very low density, towards a church at the eastern edge of the village. Grafton is on the southern ridge of the valley of the River Tove which flows east between the village and Stoke Bruerne to the north and then to the east of the village. Stoke Bruerne church and Stoke Park Pavilions are clearly visible in the distance. The Grand Union Canal passes close by to the east.

Almost all the village on the east side of the A508 is a conservation area.

Buildings
Woodville Manor House appears to have stood on the west side of the A508 road according to excavation in 1964-5. These revealed a medieval of monastic origin with a cloister and small church. They were converted to secular use in the 15th century. Tiles with the Woodville family arms were discovered in the church.

Another Manor House is on the east side of the A508 road near the parish church. It is the remains of a house built by Henry VIII. Francis Crane demolished a part of the house in the 1620s for materials to build Stoke Park at Stoke Bruerne.

The parish church is dedicated to St Mary and of early 13th-century origin.

See also
The White Queen (novel), a novel by Philippa Gregory
The White Queen (TV series), a BBC TV series based on the Gregory novels
Elizabeth Woodville Secondary School, Northamptonshire (2011)
Regis (place)
List of place names with royal patronage in the United Kingdom

References

Further reading

External links
Village website
Grafton Regis Pub, The White Hart
Grafton District Scout Band website
 

Villages in Northamptonshire
West Northamptonshire District
Civil parishes in Northamptonshire